St. Ambrose Cathedral is a historic building located in downtown Des Moines, Iowa, United States. It serves as a parish church and as the seat of the Diocese of Des Moines in the Catholic Church. The cathedral, along with the adjoining rectory, was listed on the National Register of Historic Places in 1979.

History

St. Ambrose Parish

The first Mass in what would become the city of Des Moines was celebrated in a log hut in 1851 at Fort Des Moines by Father Alexander Hattenberger, a priest from Ottumwa, Iowa. At the time, Des Moines was part of the Diocese of Dubuque, which covered the entire state of Iowa. Other priests visited the Des Moines area from time to time, including the Revs. Timothy Mullen, John Kreckel, and Louis De Cailly. In 1856, one year after the Iowa Legislature voted to move the capitol from Iowa City to its present location in Des Moines, the first St. Ambrose Church was built on land purchased by Father De Cailly. The church was built by the Rev. George Plathe, who was the first resident priest in Des Moines. It measured .

The Rev. John F. Brazill became the pastor in 1861, and he built a school in 1863. The Sisters of Charity of the Blessed Virgin Mary came to Des Moines to teach in the school. By 1865 a larger stone church building was constructed. The Gothic Revival structure featured two towers that flanked the main facade. Brazill was an influential person in the Church and in the society at large. Bishop Clement Smyth, OCSO named him the vicar general of the diocese, and he cultivated many contacts in state government. He acquired a great deal of real estate for himself and the Church that amounted to $250,000 at the time of his death in 1885. One of the parcels of land he owned at Sixth and High Streets became the site of a new St. Ambrose church in the 1890s.

St. Ambrose remained Des Moines' only Catholic church until 1869 when the Rev. Nicholas Sassel established St. Mary's, no longer extant, to serve the pastoral needs of the city's German community. Des Moines became a parish of the Diocese of Davenport when it was established in 1881. The Rev. Joseph Nugent founded Visitation Parish, now known as Our Lady of the Americas, the following year.

St. Ambrose Cathedral

The Rev. Michael Flavin started construction of the present church in 1890 and it was completed the following year. It was built for about $120,000. Bishop Henry Cosgrove dedicated the church on October 11 of the same year. James J. Egan of Chicago was the architect. He designed Sacred Heart Cathedral in Davenport at the same time. Flavin had seen a model for a high altar designed by Tiffany & Company displayed at the 1893 Columbian Exposition in Chicago. He had a copy of it made of marble in Italy for St. Ambrose. 

St. John's Parish in Des Moines was created from the northern portion of St. Ambrose Parish in 1905. Its church building would be elevated to a Minor Basilica in 1989. In 1906 St. Anthony's Parish was established on the south side of Des Moines. Its establishment was opposed by Father Flavin who incorrectly insisted it was established as an Italian ethnic parish because he did not want to lose the parish territory. The following year Flavin became the first priest of the Diocese of Davenport to be named a monsignor. St. Ambrose Church was chosen to be the cathedral of the Diocese of Des Moines when it was established by Pope Pius X on August 12, 1911. St. Augustin's Parish on the west side of Des Moines was founded from St. Ambrose in 1920.

In the 1920s Bishop Thomas Drumm and St. Ambrose pastor Francis O'Connell executed a renovation of the cathedral plant in the 1920s. The present rectory was built next to the church in 1927. A new bishop's throne of inlaid marble, pulpit, and communion rail were created for the church. The Chapel of Our Lady in the rear of the cathedral was also added at this time. A new pipe organ was added in 1929. Another renovation of the cathedral took place in the 1940s with the installation of the present stained glass windows and the Stations of the Cross. A new  reredos was created for the high altar's original mensa by Conrad Schmitt Studios of Milwaukee, and used for the first time at Christmas 1944. Another large-scale renovation of the cathedral was begun in the 1970s by Bishop Maurice Dingman out of a desire for a better liturgical environment, and because the building was in need of repairs. The Reverends John Lorenz and James Laurenzo were co-pastors at the time. A process of researching the liturgy, church architecture, and accessing the needs of the parish was put in place as a part of the larger planning process. The people of the entire diocese were also invited to participate in this process. The Rev. Maur Burbach, OSB, of St. Pius X Monastery in Pevely, Missouri was named liturgical consultant and Rambusch Decorating Company of New York City was hired to do the design work. The renovation was completed in May 1978. The cathedral's interior painting and decorating was subsequently and completely renovated again starting fall 1996, and finished in the spring of 1997, by Don A. Wendt, Ecclesiastical Studios & Sons of Greenwood, Missouri.

In a spirit of ecumenism, Bishop Dingman offered the use of St. Ambrose Cathedral for the episcopal consecration of the Rt. Rev. Walter Righter as the bishop of the Episcopal Diocese of Iowa. The event was held on January 12, 1979. The liturgy was attended by Presiding Bishop John E. Hines and 10 other bishops of the Episcopal Church, representatives from the Lutheran and Presbyterian Churches, the Des Moines Area Council of Churches, and a Jewish Rabbi.

Architecture

The cathedral was designed in the Romanesque Revival style that is similar to the historic churches found in southern France. The Bedford stone structure measures . The main façade features a prominent main entrance in the center. It is contained in a round arch below a triangular pediment. Above it are four elongated round-arched windows that are separated by a pair of columns in the Corinthian order. The entranceway is flanked on the right by a tall bell tower, which is composed of five sections that are differentiated by a change in the stonework, and topped by a pyramid-shaped spire. Flanking the left side of the entrance is a structure that is ⅔ the height of the larger church and is articulated by a semicircular projection that is topped by a conical roof. At the opposite side of the church from the entrance is a rounded apse. When it was first built the church had a symmetrical design to it. When the chapel was built that symmetry was broken.

The interior is a large open expanse that is free of pillars, which was a hallmark of Egan's style. The windows in the cathedral are translucent mosaics and depict the establishment of the Catholic faith in the United States, the State of Iowa, and the Diocese of Des Moines. They are somewhat unique as they depart from the Biblical themes or lives of the saints that are usually depicted in Catholic churches. The rose window in the Chapel of Our Lady depicts the seven gifts of the Holy Spirit. The altar, ambo and chair in the chapel were used by Pope John Paul II during a Mass he celebrated at his historic visit to Living History Farms just outside Des Moines in 1979.

Rectory

The rectory measures . It is a three-story structure that is composed of both stone and brick and is designed in the Romanesque Revival style to match the cathedral next door. The gabled roof runs parallel to that of the cathedrals'. The windows are largely rectangular in shape. On the main façade of the building, however, is a row of round-arch windows on the second floor. The center two windows are framed by an arch and engaged columns above the building's main entrance. A semi-circular staircase protrudes from the east elevation near the main façade. The structure is L-shaped and is connected to the cathedral by an arcade in the back.

See also
List of Catholic cathedrals in the United States
List of cathedrals in the United States

References

External links

 Cathedral Website
 Diocese of Des Moines Website

Ambrose, Des Moines
Roman Catholic churches in Des Moines, Iowa
Churches on the National Register of Historic Places in Iowa
National Register of Historic Places in Des Moines, Iowa
Romanesque Revival church buildings in Iowa
Religious organizations established in 1856
1856 establishments in Iowa
Roman Catholic churches completed in 1891
19th-century Roman Catholic church buildings in the United States�